Florjan Përgjoni (born 22 June 1997) is an Albanian footballer who currently plays as a left-back for Albanian club Tirana.

Career

Tirana
Përgjoni signed a three-year contract with Kategoria Superiore side Tirana on 5 July 2021. He was an unused substitute in the club's opening two league games, and made his debut on 22 September 2021 in a Kupa e Shqipërisë game away at Shkumbini where he played the full game in the 3–0 win. He would make his league debut a few days later on 25 September 2021 in a 1–1 away draw to Kastrioti, where he came on as a 73rd minute substitute for Macedonian defender Filip Najdovski. Përgjoni made his first league start for Tirana on 17 October 2021 in a thrilling 3–2 away win against the reigning Kategoria Superiore champions Teuta.

Honours

Club 
Tirana
Kategoria Superiore: 2021–22
Albanian Supercup: 2022

References

External links
Florjan Përgjoni at FSHF

1997 births
Living people
People from Lezhë County
People from Lezhë
Association football defenders
Albanian footballers
Besëlidhja Lezhë players
Shkëndija Durrës players
KS Burreli players
KF Tirana players
Kategoria e Parë players
Kategoria Superiore players